Vladimir Shmelyov (born 31 August 1946) is a former Soviet modern pentathlete and Olympic Champion. He competed at the 1972 Summer Olympics in Munich, where he won a gold medal in the team competition (together with Boris Onishchenko and Pavel Lednyov), and placed fifth in the individual competition.

References

1946 births
Living people
Soviet male modern pentathletes
Olympic modern pentathletes of the Soviet Union
Modern pentathletes at the 1972 Summer Olympics
Olympic gold medalists for the Soviet Union
Olympic medalists in modern pentathlon
Medalists at the 1972 Summer Olympics